Bogna Krasnodębska-Gardowska (19 March 1900 – 21 January 1986) was a Polish painter. Her work was part of the painting event in the art competition at the 1936 Summer Olympics.

References

1900 births
1986 deaths
20th-century Polish painters
Polish women painters
Olympic competitors in art competitions
People from Sosnowiec
20th-century Polish women